Alexandrovsk-Sakhalinsky (masculine), Alexandrovsk-Sakhalinskaya (feminine), or Alexandrovsk-Sakhalinskoye (neuter) may refer to:
Alexandrovsk-Sakhalinsky District, a district of Sakhalin Oblast, Russia
Alexandrovsk-Sakhalinsky Urban Okrug, a municipal formation (an urban okrug) this district is incorporated as
Alexandrovsk-Sakhalinsky (town), a town in Alexandrovsk-Sakhalinsky District of Sakhalin Oblast, Russia